Gyrostelma is a monotypic genus of flowering plants belonging to the family Apocynaceae. The only species is Gyrostelma oxypetaloides.

Its native range is Central Brazil.

References

Apocynaceae
Monotypic Apocynaceae genera